Stonyford may refer to:

 Stonyford, California, United States, a census-designated place
 Stoneyford, County Kilkenny, a village in Ireland
 Stonyford, Hampshire, a United Kingdom location

See also
 Stoneyford (disambiguation)